Aulacoctena is a monotypic genus of ctenophores belonging to the monotypic family Aulacoctenidae. The only species is Aulacoctena acuminata.

References

Tentaculata